Heritage College Adelaide is an R-12 school founded in 1996 by the Christadelphians who wanted to create a learning environment where the Bible was the basic foundation.  The College is located at Oakden in the north-eastern suburbs of Adelaide, South Australia. The College has approximately 400 students, as well as a Parents and Friends Community (PFA) and a Past Student Association (PSA).

Heritage College Adelaide is one of five Christadelphian Heritage Colleges in Australia; the other four are located in Perth, Cooranbong, Sydney and Melbourne.

See also

 Heritage Colleges (Australia)

External links
Heritage College Adelaide

Private schools in South Australia
A
Christadelphian organizations